Friedrichsdorf is a town of the Hochtaunuskreis, some  north of Frankfurt am Main in Hesse, Germany.

Geography

Location
 Friedrichsdorf is located in the Taunus area, ranking third among the Hochtaunuskreis boroughs after Bad Homburg vor der Höhe and Oberursel (Taunus). The municipal area includes, on the one hand,  agricultural land such as that between Burgholzhausen and the edge of the Wetterau. On the other hand, there are vast woodlands on the crest of the Taunus, where the highest point in Friedrichsdorf's rural areas can be found: the Gickelsburg at 471 m above sea level. From the Taunus' heights, the river Erlenbach makes its way down and through town.

Neighbouring communities
Friedrichsdorf borders in the north and east on the town of Rosbach (Wetteraukreis), in the south on the town of Bad Homburg, and in the west on the community of Wehrheim.

History
The town's founding in 1687 goes back to the persecution of the Huguenots in France, where millions of them fled their country. Part of this exodus was granted asylum by Landgrave Friedrich II with the words "Lieber will ich mein Silbergerät verkaufen, als diesen armen Leuten die Aufnahme versagen" ("I would rather sell my silverware than deny these poor people asylum."). The Huguenots then founded Friedrichsdorf, gratefully naming it after the Landgrave. They brought flannel and stockings with them from France, which spread quickly.

Later, Zwieback was produced in Friedrichsdorf, which is why Friedrichsdorf is known as the "Town of Zwieback". The zwieback factory "Emil Louis Pauly" became Milupa, still in business now as a baby food maker, and still headquartered in Friedrichsdorf. It is now owned by Numico, a Dutch company, and the production facilities have been moved abroad.

The town's most famous son was Johann Philipp Reis, a teacher at the Institut Garnier. He is the inventor of the electric transmission of speech, better known as the telephone and has been dedicated a museum. Friedrichsdorf's comprehensive school (Philipp-Reis-Schule) is also named after him.

In 1916, Dillingen, which had been founded only in 1804, was joined with Friedrichsdorf. Dillingen took its name from a village which had been forsaken in the Thirty Years' War, on the rural area of which Friedrichsdorf's Huguenots later settled. Paul Tirard reported that the town archives were kept in French up until 1871, but thenceforth in German. He also states that the names on grave stones were French up and till 1914 and that Protestant Sunday services were held locally up until the same date.

Constituent communities
In July 1972 the communities of Friedrichsdorf, Seulberg, Köppern and Burgholzhausen merged to form the town of Friedrichsdorf/Taunus.

Köppern
Köppern had its first documentary mention in 1269. At this time, Buchard von Printsac was given in fief a watermill at "coppern" by Count Gerhard von Eppstein. Linen weaving and brickmaking were for a long time, next to farming, the most important economic activities. Later came hatmaking and tanning. In 1901, the Waldkrankenhaus ("Forest Hospital"), which still stands today (as the Fachklinik für Psychiatrie und Psychotherapie, or Specialized Clinic for Psychiatry and Psychotherapy) was founded by Dr. Emil Sioli from Frankfurt.

Köppern has a street hockey team, trained by, among others, professional hockey player Ingo Schwarz, who plays for Rote Teufel Bad Nauheim.

Burgholzhausen

In 1221, Burgholzhausen was being mentioned as Holzhausen in documents. The most important economic activity next to farming and linen weaving was said to be tilemaking, whose raw materials were dug from nearby clay pits. In the late 17th century, through the Ingelheimer family's lordly leadership, fruit growing was brought to Burgholzhausen

Seulberg
Seulberg was first mentioned in the Lorsch codex in 767. It is said to be one of the oldest settled places in the Hochtaunuskreis. Besides farming and linen weaving, pottery has long been an important activity here. With the Huguenots in Friedrichsdorf there was brisk trade. In a somewhat less cheerful chapter in Seulberg's history, there were witch trials in the 17th century which resulted in 31 women being put to death.

Coat of arms

Friedrichsdorf was given its first civic coat of arms in 1821 in remembrance of Russian Princess Alexandra's – and her eight guests' – visit to Count Friedrich in Bad Homburg: In azure a ring of nine roses argent (i.e. a blue shield with a ring of nine silver roses).

After amalgamation, a new coat of arms was created in 1975, taking the newly amalgamated parts of town into account. It might heraldically be described thus: Party per saltire, above, in azure a rose argent, dexter in argent a four-spoked wheel gules, sinister in argent a horseshoe gules, below, in gules a tower Or. The silver rose charge has been kept, although now there is only one instead of a ring of nine. The red stylized wheel stands for Köppern and the red horseshoe for Seulberg. The tower comes from Burgholzhausen's old arms.

Economy and infrastructure

Transport
Through Friedrichsdorf's outlying rural areas runs Autobahn A5, an important traffic artery that also has an interchange at the northern edge of the municipal area (16, Friedberg / Friedrichsdorf). Furthermore, Federal Highway (Bundesstraße) B 455 also runs through the town.

The town is also well supplied when it comes to rail transport. There are four stations: one in every constituent community. Friedrichsdorf station is the end of Rhine-Main S-Bahn line S 5. Also, railcars from the Frankfurt-Königstein Railway, which run on the Taunusbahn stop here. The cross-country connection to the Main-Weser Railway to Friedberg is provided by the Butzbach-Lich Railway.

Frankfurt International Airport can easily be reached by road. Also, the Firma Rotorflug can also be found in Friedrichsdorf, offering helicopter flights.

Population
(in each case on 31 December)

Politics

Town council elections

Mayor
 Horst Burghardt (Green) is mayor of Friedrichsdorf since 1997. In March 2021, Lars Keitel (Green) was elected as his successor.

Twin towns – sister cities

Friedrichsdorf is twinned with:
 Bad Wimsbach-Neydharting, Austria (1968)
 Houilles, France (1973)
 Chesham, England, United Kingdom (1980)

Schools
Philipp-Reis-Schule
King's College The British School of Frankfurt

Notable people

François Blanc (1806–1877), French entrepreneur and operator of casinos
Abraham Louis Wallon (1807–1889), Methodist preacher in Germany and the United States
Pierre Jean Édouard Desor (1811–1882), German-Swiss geologist and naturalist
Paul Cérésole (1832–1905), Swiss politician and judge of the Supreme Court (1867–1870) 
Johann Philipp Reis (1834–1874), teacher and inventor of the Reis telephone 
Karl Willy Wagner (1883–1953), pioneer in the theory of electronic filters
Martin Schneider (born 1964), comedian, cabarettist and actor
Rob Pilatus (1965–1998), model, dancer and singer

Religion

In Friedrichsdorf stands one of the two Temples of the Church of Jesus Christ of Latter-day Saints in Germany, called the Frankfurt Germany Temple (the other one is in Freiberg, Saxony). The Temple was dedicated for operation in 1987 by then President of the Church of Jesus Christ of Latter-day Saints, Ezra Taft Benson.

References

External links

 Friedrichsdorf am Taunus
 Philipp-Reis-Schule (PRS)
 Rhein-Main International Montessori School (RIMS)

Hochtaunuskreis